Duty is an unincorporated community in Dickenson County, Virginia, in the United States.

History
A post office was established at Duty in 1888, and remained in operation until it was discontinued in 1958. One Mr. Duty, an early postmaster, gave the community his last name. Duty (pronounced "Doo-tee") was home to one of the largest coal mines in the world at the time, Clinchfield Coal Company's Moss #3 complex.

References

Unincorporated communities in Dickenson County, Virginia
Unincorporated communities in Virginia